Harry Pickering may refer to:
 Harry Pickering (cricketer)
 Harry Pickering (footballer)

See also
 Henry Pickering (disambiguation)